The Gospel of Andrew is a gospel mentioned by Innocent I and Augustine. It is perhaps identical with the Acts of Andrew.

See also
List of Gospels

References

Apocryphal Gospels
Andrew the Apostle